The LNFA 2014 season was the 20th season of top-tier American football in Spain.

As in the previous season, the teams were divided into two categories, renamed Serie A and Serie B, with promotion and relegation between both divisions.

The 2013-14 season started on November 6, with the first game of the Spanish Cup, and finished on June 15, with the LNFA Bowl game.

L'Hospitalet Pioners are the defending champions, but lost to Badalona Dracs in the semifinals. Dracs ended the season winning their sixth title.

Spanish Cup

Seven teams entered the competition. L'Hospitalet Pioners won the title for the fifth time in a row and ninth overall.

LNFA Serie A

Six teams entered the LNFA Serie A, the top-tier level of American football in Spain. L'Hospitalet Pioners, Rivas Osos, Valencia Firebats, Rivas Osos and Badalona Dracs repeated from last year. Granada Lions were promoted from last year LNFA Serie B.

Regular season

Playoffs

LNFA Serie B

14 teams entered the LNFA Serie B, the second level of American football in Spain. They were divided in three conferences.

Eight teams qualified to the promotion playoffs, where the three group winners had the three first seeds.

The four worst teams in the regular season played to avoid the relegation to the new Serie C, which will be created in 2015. Alicante Sharks and Sueca Ricers were relegated to Serie C.

Regular season

North Group

East Group

South Group

Promotion playoffs

Relegation playoffs

|}

Alicante Sharks and Sueca Ricers are relegated to 2014–15 Serie C.

Promotion/relegation playoffs
The fifth placed team in Serie A played Serie B runner-up. The game took place in Valencia on June 7. Valencia Giants won the game and will play in next season Serie A.

|}

References

External links
FEFA American Football Spanish Federation

Liga Nacional de Fútbol Americano
2014 in Spanish sport
2014 in American football